Vadim Pobudey (born 17 December 1994) is a Belarusian professional footballer who plays for Torpedo-BelAZ Zhodino.

International career
He made his debut for the Belarus national football team on 8 October 2021 in a World Cup qualifier against Estonia.

Honours
Dinamo Brest
Belarusian Cup winner: 2016–17

Gomel
Belarusian Cup winner: 2021–22

References

External links 
 
 

1994 births
Living people
Belarusian footballers
Belarusian expatriate footballers
Association football midfielders
Belarus international footballers
Belarusian Premier League players
Kazakhstan Premier League players
Belarusian expatriate sportspeople in Kazakhstan
Expatriate footballers in Kazakhstan
FC Baranovichi players
FC Dynamo Brest players
FC Isloch Minsk Raion players
FC Dnyapro Mogilev players
FC Zhetysu players
FC Gomel players
FC Torpedo-BelAZ Zhodino players